Vladimir Mikhailovich Silovanov (born 3 February 1967) is a Russian professional football manager and a former player. He is the manager of Volna Nizhny Novgorod Oblast .

External links
 

1967 births
People from Ostashkovsky District
Living people
Russian footballers
Association football midfielders
Russian expatriate footballers
Expatriate footballers in Lithuania
Expatriate footballers in Belarus
FC Kristall Smolensk players
Interas-AE Visaginas players
FC Naftan Novopolotsk players
Russian football managers
FC Iskra Smolensk players
Sportspeople from Tver Oblast